Ramon Muntaner (1265 – 1336) was a Catalan mercenary and writer who wrote the Crònica, a chronicle of his life, including his adventures as a commander in the Catalan Company. He was born at Peralada.

Biography 
The Catalan Company was an army of light infantry under the leadership of Roger de Flor that was made up of Aragonese and Catalan mercenaries, known as Almogavars; Roger led the Company to Constantinople to help the Greeks against the Turks.

For a lapse of time (1308-1315) he was governor of the island of Djerba, after its conquest by the Crown Of Aragon.

Ramon Muntaner's Crònica is one of the four Catalan Grand Chronicles through which the historian views thirteenth- and fourteenth century military and political matters in the Crown of Aragon and the Principality of Catalonia.

He died at Ibiza in 1336.

Notes

References
 The Chronicle of Ramon Muntaner, translated into English by Lady Goodenough (pdf file)
Crònica de Ramon Muntaner at the institut Lluís Vives, (in Catalan)

External links

Selections in Catalan, English and Spanish of Muntaner's Crònica (pedagogical edition) with introduction, notes, and bibliography in Open Iberia/América (open access teaching anthology)

1270 births
1336 deaths
People from Alt Empordà
Medieval Catalan-language writers
Soldiers from Catalonia
Catalan Company
13th-century Catalan people
14th-century Catalan people